Chen Chuankuo (born October 1945) is a lieutenant general in the People's Liberation Army of China. He was a member of the 16th Central Committee of the Chinese Communist Party and a member of the Standing Committee of the 11th Chinese People's Political Consultative Conference.

Biography
Chen was born in Huainan, Anhui, in October 1945. He secondary studied at Huainan No. 2 High School. He joined the Chinese Communist Party (CCP) in January 1966, and enlisted in the People's Liberation Army (PLA) in January 1970. He served in the Central Guards Regiment from 1970 to 1978 and the People's Liberation Army General Staff Department from 1978 to 1993. In April 1993, he became deputy chief of staff of the People's Armed Police, rising to chief of staff in December 1999. He was commissioned as deputy commander in December 2003, serving in the post until his retirement in January 2009.

He was promoted to the rank of major general (shaojiang) in September 1994 and lieutenant general (zhongjiang) in July 2001.

References

1945 births
Living people
People from Huainan
PLA National Defence University alumni
People's Liberation Army generals from Anhui
People's Republic of China politicians from Anhui
Chinese Communist Party politicians from Anhui
Members of the 16th Central Committee of the Chinese Communist Party
Members of the Standing Committee of the 11th Chinese People's Political Consultative Conference